Mike Lafferty (born October 25, 1975) is an American former motorcycle enduro competitor.  He is a multi-time AMA National Enduro Champion. He has been racing at the championship level since 1993 when he won the AMA Regional Championship. Lafferty has won eight AMA National Enduro Championships, which ties the record previously set by Dick Burleson. He has 69 National wins.

Born in Port Elizabeth, New Jersey, Lafferty has been factory sponsored by manufacturers such as KTM USA, part of KTM, an international manufacturer of on and off-road sporting motorcycles. In 2009, Husaberg North America, a division of KTM Motorsports, Inc. signed Mike to the Husaberg Factory Race Team for the remainder of the 2009 and 2010 season.

His father, Jack Lafferty, is also known within the sport as a very competitive senior class rider, and for being largely responsible for his son's success since a young age. At regional enduro events, Jack is recognized for his physical longevity and riding skill, both of which he has managed to maintain in spite of his advanced age.  He consistently outpaces many younger, healthier riders.

In the US Enduro community, the Lafferty name has become synonymous with the sport. Mike Lafferty in particular, is a well-known figure, respected by the community's constituents.  In addition to his factory sponsorships, Lafferty receives product sponsorships from various motorcycle product manufacturers (primarily in an off-road context, but also from manufacturers who make products for on and off-road riding such as tire and clothing manufacturers, or products such as race-fuels and other fluids).

In a motorsport that does not receive much press coverage, and is supported by only a small fan following outside of the participants themselves and their families, there is not a lot of prize money or advertising (spokesperson) contracts. Factory sponsorship in Enduro racing does not include contracts that are comparable to those received by factory riders in motorsports like Supercross.  Regardless, a few select riders who have attained the very pinnacle of success in the sport of Enduro on a regular basis have managed to make a good living out of racing in the sport. Lafferty is one of those few.

2009 - 2010 Rekluse/AMA National Enduro Series results
Michael Lafferty gave Husaberg their first-ever national enduro win with a come-from-behind victory at the 60th running of the Alligator Enduro in Daytona Beach, Florida – round three of the Rekluse/AMA National Enduro Series. He finished third in Tennessee, third in Texas, and third in Georgia.

References

External links
MikeLafferty.com - Official site
 http://www.nationalenduro.com/documents/Lafferty_Interview_11-19.pdf

1975 births
Living people
People from Maurice River Township, New Jersey
Enduro riders
American motorcycle racers